My Soul To Keep is the début album from Brooklyn rapper Sha Stimuli.  It was released on 27 October 2009.
The first single was "Move Back" produced by Just Blaze and featured Freeway and Young Chris.

Track listing

References

2009 debut albums
E1 Music albums
Albums produced by Beat Butcha
Albums produced by Just Blaze